Basil Wood (9 November 1900 – 1977) was an English footballer who played in the Football League for Leeds United.

References

1900 births
1977 deaths
English footballers
Association football forwards
English Football League players
Crook Town A.F.C. players
Leeds United F.C. players
Sheffield Wednesday F.C. players